Weardale Way is a footpath that follows the River Wear in the North East of England. It is 73 miles long, starting at the Lindesfarne Memorial on the sea wall at Roker (a part of the City of Sunderland).  It then passes through Chester-le-Street, Durham, Bishop Auckland, Wolsingham and Stanhope. The path ends outside the Post Office in the village of Wearhead in County Durham.

Within the area administered by the City of Sunderland local authority, the route is meant to follow that marked as the River Wear Trail; unfortunately, many of the markers for this route have been removed by vandals. Once the route goes into the area administered by the Durham County Council, it is waymarked to some extent by plastic disks attached to wooden and metal posts, trees and street furniture. There are several wooden 'finger' signs along the route that countdown the distance along the footpath in both directions.

This path is marked on the latest series of Ordnance Survey 1:25,000 maps, Explorer sheets 305, 307, 308 and OL31 cover the walk.

A guide to the walk is available: The Weardale Way, A Pictorial Walking Guide by Alistair Wallace (Jema Publications, 1997).

Points of interest on or near the route
 Roker Pier
 Penshaw Monument
 Lumley Castle
 Chester-le-Street Riverside Cricket Ground
 Finchale Priory
 Durham Cathedral
 Durham Castle
 Croxdale Hall
 Escomb Church

See also
 Long-distance footpaths in the UK

References

Geography of County Durham
Geography of Tyne and Wear
Tourist attractions in County Durham
Tourist attractions in Tyne and Wear
Long-distance footpaths in England